SK Rapid Wien is an Austria professional football team formed in 1899. Throughout its history the club's first team has competed in various national and international competitions. All players who have played in 50 or more such matches are listed below.

Key
Players with name in bold currently play for the club.
Years are the first and last calendar years in which the player appeared in competitive first-team football for the club.
League appearances and goals comprise those in the Austrian Football Bundesliga and its predecessors of top-level league football in Austria, including the Gauliga from 1938 to 1945 during Austrias annexation by Nazi Germany.
Total appearances and goals comprise those in the League, Austrian Cup (replaced by the Tschammerpokal from 1938-45), Austrian Supercup and international appearances in UEFA competitions and the Mitropa Cup.

Players with 50 or more appearances
Appearances and goals are for first-team competitive matches only. Substitute appearances are included. Statistics are correct as of 19 March 2023.
 
Position key:
GK – Goalkeeper; 
DF – Defender;
MF – Midfielder;
FW – Forward

References
General
Players – SV Rapid Wien at Rapidarchiv.at

Specific

 
Rapid Wien
Association football player non-biographical articles